Jim McDougall is a former association footballer who represented New Zealand as a goalkeeper at international level.

McDougall made four appearances for the All Whites, all against the touring Canadians. His first match ended in a 2–2 draw on 25 June 1927, followed by a 1–2 loss, a 1–0 win and his final match a 1–4 loss on 23 July 1927

References 

Year of birth missing (living people)
Living people
New Zealand association footballers
New Zealand international footballers
Association football goalkeepers